The Geddes Axe was the drive for public economy and retrenchment in UK government expenditure recommended in the 1920s by a Committee on National Expenditure chaired by Sir Eric Geddes and with Lord Inchcape, Lord Faringdon, Sir Joseph Maclay and Sir Guy Granet also members.

Background

During and after the Great War, government expenditure and taxation increased. Taxation per head per annum was £18 in 1919; £22 in 1920; and £24 in 1921. In 1913–14 the Civil Services and Revenue Departments cost £81.3 million; in 1920–21 they cost £523.3 million; and in 1921–22 they cost £590.7 million. The Armed Forces cost around £77 million in the year before the War and approaching £190 million in 1921–22. Similarly, the National Debt and other Consolidated Fund Services increased over the same time from £37.3 million to £359.8 million.

In 1921 the Anti-Waste League was formed by Lord Rothermere to campaign against what they considered wasteful government expenditure, and three of its candidates won by-elections from government supporters between February and June 1921. In May 1921 HM Treasury sent all government departments a circular citing that in 1921–22 the cost of Supply Services would be £603 million and that this should be reduced in the next financial year to £490 million—economies totalling £113 million. Instead the response was a plan to reduce this expenditure by £75 million. The Prime Minister David Lloyd George appointed Geddes as head of a committee in August 1921 to find where economies could be found in various government departments for 1922–23. The committee's terms of reference were:

To make recommendations to the Chancellor of the Exchequer for effecting forthwith all possible reductions in the National Expenditure on Supply Services, having regard especially to the present and prospective position of the Revenue. Insofar as questions of policy are involved in the expenditure under discussion, these will remain for the exclusive consideration of the Cabinet; but it will be open to the Committee to review the expenditure and to indicate the economies which might be effected if particular policies were either adopted, abandoned or modified.

Sometime after its appointment the Chancellor Sir Robert Horne requested that the committee find where expenditure could be reduced by £175 million, which meant total expenditure down to £428 million. The committee's reports were shown to the Cabinet in December 1921 and January 1922, where Cabinet committees reviewed and modified them before publication in February. Three Reports were published:

First Interim Report of Committee on National Expenditure. (Cmd. 1581. Pp. 172.)
Second Interim Report of Committee on National Expenditure. (Cmd. 1582. Pp. 113.)
Third Interim Report of Committee on National Expenditure. (Cmd. 1589. Pp. 170.)

The Axe

The Reports advocated economies totalling £87 million; the Cabinet decided on savings amounting to £52 million. Total defence expenditure fell to £111 million in 1922–23 from £189.5 million in 1921–22; total social spending (education, health, housing, pensions, unemployment) fell from £205.8 million in 1920–21 to £182.1 million in 1922–23. After 1922–23 defence spending increased to £114.7 million in 1924–25, and social spending—after dipping to £175.5 million in 1923–24—increased to £177.4 million in 1924–25.

As a metaphor
Geddes Axe may have been the first use of axe as a metaphor for financial cuts.  The  earliest citations for axe used in this sense in the Oxford English Dictionary are all in the context of the Geddes Axe.  The very earliest citation is in the Glasgow Herald in October 1922.  It was used in The Times in March 1923 in an article concerning the limit of safety of army cuts: "No fewer than 1,500 officers had fallen before the Geddes axe."  For a time the Geddes Axe became a metaphor for any change that improved efficiency or increased simplicity.  For instance, Rupert Gould in The Marine Chronometer (1923) wrote,

Notes

Further reading
Henry Higgs, 'The Geddes Reports and the Budget', The Economic Journal, Vol. 32, No. 126. (Jun., 1922), pp. 251–264.
Andrew McDonald, 'The Geddes Committee and the Formulation of Public Expenditure Policy', 1921–1922, The Historical Journal, Vol. 32, No. 3 (Sep., 1989), pp. 643–674.
Peter K. Cline, 'Eric Geddes and the 'Experiment' with Businessmen in Government, 1915–1922', in Kenneth D. Brown (ed.), Essays in Anti-Labour History (London: Macmillan, 1974), pp. 74–104.

Economic history of the United Kingdom
1920s in the United Kingdom
1920s economic history
1921 in the United Kingdom
1922 in the United Kingdom
1921 in economics
1922 in economics